Roto is a Spanish language term used in parts of South America for Chilean people.

Roto may also refer to:

 Roto, New South Wales, Australian settlement
 Roto North America, window/door hardware manufacturing and distribution company 
 Rotogravure, a type of printed photograph
 Rotoscoping, animation technique
 Roto, the Japanese name for Erdrick, the main character in the Dragon Quest video game franchise
 a nickname for Rotisserie League Baseball in Fantasy baseball
 a nickname for rotisserie sports, aka fantasy sports

See also
 
 Rotor (disambiguation)
 Jesus Arriaga or Chucho el Roto (1858–1885), a legendary Tlaxcalan bandit